Evangelical United Brethren Church may refer to:

Evangelical United Brethren Church, a religious denomination

or it may refer to specific notable church buildings:

Evangelical United Brethren Church (Fullerton, Nebraska), listed on the NRHP in Nebraska
Evangelical United Brethren Church (Dayton, Oregon), listed on the NRHP in Oregon
Evangelical United Brethren Church (Watertown, South Dakota), listed on the NRHP in South Dakota